Valladolid is one of the municipalities of the Lempira department of Honduras. It takes about 2.5 hours to travel there and it must be via Santa Rosa de Copán–San Marcos de Ocotepeque–Cololaca–Tambla–Valladolid.

History 

It was founded in the "Los Patios" village, with the former name of "Colopel", it was later relocated to "Los Naranjos" villages, where it is nowadays; and the name was changed to Valladolid. In the census of 1887 it was registered as a municipality of Guarita district.

Geography 

The origin of the rocks and soils in its mountains is totally volcanic. This is clearly seen on the slopes of the road. The municipality capital is on top of a mountain, and there are many pine forest and some sub tropical trees to provide shade to coffee plants. The weather is very cool because of the elevation and the Pine forests.

Boundaries 
Its boundaries are: 
North: Tambla municipality.
South: La Virtud  municipality.
East: San Andrés and Gualcince municipalities. 
West: Guarita and San Juan Guarita municipalities.
Surface Extents: 74 km2

Resources 

It is one more of the municipalities proper for coffee plantation. The second main activity is commerce, starting with groceries followed by several supplies for construction and farming. Cattle raising, beans and corn crops are mostly for local consumption. It has electricity and mobile communication services. It also has a couple of hardware stores.

Population 
Population: The amount of inhabitants was 3,646 and according to INE Honduras estimates, there will be 3,747 in 2015. (these figures are subject to verification)
Villages: 12
Settlements: 44

Demographics
At the time of the 2013 Honduras census, Valladolid municipality had a population of 3,696. Of these, 72.58% were Mestizo, 14.29% Indigenous (14.23% Lenca), 12.64% White and 0.49% Black or Afro-Honduran.

Tourism 

As the traveler approaches the municipality capital they go up a long section, this particular section is very dangerous because there are very deep cliffs. Some curves also need attention. One of the features of this municipality capital is the streets paved with rocks, since they did a very good job. The Pine forests all around give a special touch to the landscapes of the surrounding mountains. The people are very nice and welcoming.

Local Holidays: "San Antonio" day on June 13.

References

Municipalities of the Lempira Department